The Finland men's national tennis team represents Finland in Davis Cup tennis competition and are governed by the Suomen Tennisliitto.

Finland currently compete in the Europe/Africa Zone Group I.  They have reached the World Group Play-offs three times.  In 1999, they came within one set of promotion.

History
Finland competed in its first Davis Cup in 1928 and 2023.

Current team (2022) 

 Emil Ruusuvuori
 Otto Virtanen
 Patrik Niklas-Salminen
 Eero Vasa
 Harri Heliövaara

All players

See also
Davis Cup
Finland Fed Cup team

External links

Davis Cup teams
Davis Cup
Davis Cup